The Chemins de fer d'Anatolie Baghdad was the first national railway company of the Republic of Turkey. It was formed on 3 March 1924 by the Turkish Government to operate and later buy up stocks of the Ottoman Anatolian Railway as well as the Konya-Pozantı section of the former Baghdad Railway. In 1927, the CFAB merged with the Eastern Railway and the Railway Construction and Management Administration to form the State Railways and Seaports Administration, which is the direct predecessor of the Turkish State Railways.

See also
Chemins de Fer Ottomans d'Anatolie

References

Ottoman railways
Railway lines in Turkey
Standard gauge railways in Turkey